"Party Starters" is a song by J-pop boy band Arashi, from the group's seventeenth studio album, This Is Arashi (2020). It was written by Sam Hollander, Grant Michaels, Funk Uchino, Sho Sakurai, and produced by Sam Hollander and Grant Michaels. It was released by J Storm as a digital single on October 30, 2020.

Release 
"Party Starters" was originally set to be released on June 12, 2020, however, due to the George Floyd protests and the Black Lives Matter movement, the release was postponed to October 30, 2020.

Music video 
The music video for "Party Starters" was released on November 3, 2020.

Charts

References

External links 
 Official music video

2020 singles 
2020 songs
Arashi songs
J Storm singles
English-language Japanese songs
Songs written by Sam Hollander